VanEffen International   is a privately owned, public-use airport in Marquette County, Michigan, United States. Nearby airports include Sawyer International, Delta County Airport in Escanaba, and Ford Airport in Iron Mountain.

Facilities and aircraft 
For the 12-month period ending December 31, 2018, the airport had 50 general aviation aircraft operations.

References

External links 
Rock, Bonnie Field (6Y4) at Michigan Airport Directory

Defunct airports in Michigan
Airports in Michigan
Buildings and structures in Marquette County, Michigan
Transportation in Marquette County, Michigan
Airports in the Upper Peninsula of Michigan